Max Surban  is a Filipino Cebuano singer-songwriter. He has been given the "King of Visayan Song".  Although known primarily for his singing of novelty songs, he has also recorded romantic ballads. 

Like his fellow Visayan, the Bol-anon singer Yoyoy Villame, Max Surban has also become famous for his singing of so-called novelty songs. On several occasions, both Yoyoy Villame and Max Surban have appeared together on stage and even recorded together with a few albums. They were also in the Pamilya Ukay-OKay comedy TV show in Cebu. 

Max wrote most of his own songs and, at the time of this writing, has made more than 30 albums. He also wrote and sang Tagalog songs. 

Ang Tao'y Marupok of late Rico J. Puno song was composed by Max Surban and Ernie Dela Pena. He wrote songs for Pilita Corrales includes their duets such as Kon Magkabulag Ta, Gugmang Dinali-Dali, Pagbantay Gyud Inday and Diyos Ko Day songs.

Awards

Below are some of Max's awards and honours:
Two Awit Award for "Regional Song Recording" 
Nabali Ang Kristmas Tree – Platinum Record Award and Gold Record Award  (Sunshine) 
Mad Mad Kuno – Gold Record Award (Sunshine) 
Vendors Boogie – Platinum Record Award (Sunshine) 
Apir Apri Apir -Gold Record Award (Sunshine) 
Ang Trato Ko – Gold Record Award (Vicor) 
Max Surban Medley – Platinum Record Award (Vicor) 
Bahandi Lifetime Achievement Award

Discography

Albums

CD Album and LP Albums (Songs)

"Ang Labing Makalingaw Nga Mga Awit Ni..." (1983)

"Apir Apir Apir" Album

"Mad Max Kuno" Album (1984)

"Okay-Okay" (1986)

"Mr. Kodaker" Album (1985)

"Nabali Ang Krismas Tri" Late 1984 Album

"La Isla Banana" LP

"Ang Trato Ko" (1988) LP

"Pastilan Kanimo No. 1!" (1986) LP

"Aruy! Aray! Aruy!" (1987) LP

Adto Pakasal Sa Mt. Diwalwal LP (1987)

Vendors Boogie (1989)

Kon Magkabulag Ta with Pilita Corrales

Kuarta

Be Kayen To Animals (1995)

Ballroom To D' Max (1996)

Komedya Karambola CD (1996)

Dubol Rambols w/ Yoyoy Villame CD

Dobol Trobol Rambol Vol.1 CD with Yoyoy Villame

Dobol Trobol Rambol Vol.2 CD with Yoyoy Villame

Krismas Bolrum CD (Alphabetical Order)

Magkonsintresyon Max Surban CD

Kurdapya (432455645645645 LP

"Albularyong Buta" LP (1983)

"Ako Na Gud Ni" LP (1983)

"Carinderia Blues" (1978)

Recognitions
In 2019, Surban was recognized as one of the Top 100 Cebuano personalities by The Freeman, Cebu's longest-running newspaper. He was recognized alongside Tomas Osmeña, Resil Mojares, and Rubilen Amit as part of the centennial anniversary of the local newspaper.

Max Surban receives Lifetime Achievement Award 

Novelty singer-comedian: Max Surban finally gets “recognized” in his hometown

References

External links
Max Surban's Official Website
Max Surban Facebook
Max Surban Official YouTube Channel

20th-century Filipino male singers
Living people
1939 births
Filipino singer-songwriters
People from Cebu City
Vicor Music artists
Singers from Cebu